is a Japanese diplomat who currently serves as Japanese ambassador to the United States.

Career 
Tomita was born in Fukuoka in 1957 and grew up in Hyogo prefecture. He joined the Ministry of Foreign Affairs after graduating from the Faculty of Law at the University of Tokyo in 1981. After joining the Ministry he was sent to Oxford University for two years to receive training in the English language and international politics.

His career as a diplomat included a previous tour in Washington during the administration of Barack Obama, as well as previous ambassadorships to Israel and South Korea. In an interview, he said his familiarity with Obama-era officials led to his reappointment as ambassador after the election of Joe Biden.

Personal life 

His wife, Noriko, is the daughter of the author Yukio Mishima. They have a son and two daughters.

Tomita has published two books in Japanese on British prime ministers Winston Churchill and Margaret Thatcher, the latter of which received the Shichihei Yamamoto Award in 2019.

References 

People from Fukuoka Prefecture
Living people
1957 births
Ambassadors of Japan to the United States
Ambassadors of Japan to South Korea
University of Tokyo alumni